During the 1997–98 English football season, Tranmere Rovers F.C. competed in the Football League First Division.

Season summary
In the 1997–98 season, Tranmere had a poor start to the campaign with just three wins from their opening 14 league games which increased the pressure on player-manager Aldridge and by February were in the relegation zone, two points adrift from safety but then a brilliant run of 6 wins from 10 league games helped Tranmere on their way to escaping the drop.

Final league table

Results
Tranmere Rovers' score comes first

Legend

Football League First Division

FA Cup

League Cup

Squad

References

Tranmere Rovers F.C. seasons
Tranmere Rovers